MRIS may refer to:

Metropolitan Regional Information Systems, a realtors' Multiple Listing Service database in the Washington, DC metro area
Menopausal Research and Info Service, a British website

Marginal Rate of Intertemporal Substitution
Macroeconomics